OSU Football may refer to:

Oklahoma State Cowboys football, the NCAA Division 1 football team of Oklahoma State University (OSU), playing in the Big 12 conference
Oregon State Beavers football, the NCAA Division 1 football team of Oregon State University (OSU), playing in the Pac-12 conference
Ohio State Buckeyes football, the football program of the Ohio State University (OSU), playing in the Big Ten conference